GIMPshop was a modification of the free and open source graphics program GNU Image Manipulation Program (GIMP), with the intent to imitate the look and feel of Adobe Photoshop.

History
GIMPshop was created by Scott Moschella of Next New Networks (formerly Attack of the Show!) as an unofficial fork of GIMP. According to Moschella:

He encountered resistance from GIMP's lead developers due to the methods he employed to implement his hacks.  GIMPshop was originally developed for Mac OS X as a Universal Binary. It was ported to Microsoft Windows, Linux, and Solaris.

Development of GIMPshop effectively ceased by 2007, with the final version being based on GIMP version 2.2.11. Some users extended the lifespan of GIMPshop by manually updating GIMPshop's libraries themselves.

Features
GIMPshop shared GIMP's feature list, customisability, and availability on multiple platforms, but had a different graphical user interface modeled on that of Photoshop. As a result, many tutorials for past versions of Photoshop could be followed in GIMPshop with little or no modification. All of GIMP's own plugins (filters, brushes, etc.) were available in GIMPshop.

Being based on GIMP, GIMPshop could not generate CMYK output files by default. Users who needed to generate color separations required additional software, since commercial printing requires CMYK, not RGB color channels. A workaround was made available through the Separate+ plugin.

In the Windows version, GIMPshop used a plugin called Deweirdifyer to combine the application's numerous windows in a similar manner to the MDI system used by most Windows graphics packages. This added a unifying background window that fully contained the entire GIMPshop UI.  A third-party add-on for GIMP provided support for Photoshop plugins, called pspi, on Microsoft Windows or Linux.

For Mac OS X, GIMPshop was compatible only with Panther (10.3.x) and Tiger (10.4.x). It requires the X11.app (based on the X Window System display protocol) to render the user interface. Newer versions of X11 are no longer compatible with GIMPshop.

Status
Due to pending concerns over rights to the GIMPshop name, and a dispute with the individual who purchased the gimpshop.com domain, plans for an update are on hold. As explained by Moschella in 2010:

In a March 2014 discussion, Moschella states:

See also

 GIMP
 Adobe Photoshop
 Comparison of raster graphics editors
 Seashore
 GimPhoto

References

External links
 

Free raster graphics editors
Raster graphics editors for Linux
Technical communication tools
Graphics software that uses GTK